According to the Book of Genesis, Dan (Dān, "judgment" or "he judged") was the first of the two sons of Jacob and Bilhah (Jacob's fifth son). His mother, Bilhah, was Rachel's handmaid, who becomes one of Jacob's concubines (Book of Genesis). In the Biblical account, he is the founder of the Israelite Tribe of Dan. He was the father of Hushim, according to Gen 46:23. Samson was a descendant of Dan.

Name
The text of the Torah explains that the name of Dan derives from dananni, meaning "he has judged me", in reference to Rachel's belief that she had gained a child as the result of a judgment from God.

Biblical references
Owing to the Book of Judges, in the account of Micah's Idol, describing the Tribe of Dan as having used ephod and teraphim in worship, and Samson (a member of the Tribe of Dan) being described as failing to adhere to the rules of a Nazarite, classical rabbinical writers concluded that Dan was very much a black sheep. In the Book of Jeremiah, the north of Canaan is associated with darkness and evil, and so rabbinical sources treated Dan as the archetype of wickedness.

In the apocryphal Testaments of the Patriarchs, Dan is portrayed as having hated Joseph, and having been the one that invented the idea of deceiving Jacob by the smearing of Joseph's coat with the blood of a kid. In the apocryphal Prayer of Asenath, Dan is portrayed as plotting with the Egyptian crown prince, against Joseph and Asenath. In the Blessing of Jacob, Dan is described as a serpent, which seems to have been interpreted as connecting Dan to Belial, a connection made, for example, in the apocryphal Testament of Dan.

Early Christian writers, such as Irenaeus and Hippolytus, even believed that the Antichrist would come from the Tribe of Dan.

John the Apostle omits the Tribe of Dan when mentioning the twelve tribes of the sons of Israel, in regard to the 144,000 sealed Israelites. Instead of Dan, the tribe of Joseph appears twice (being also represented by Manasseh).

References

External links

Founders of biblical tribes
Children of Jacob
Burials in Israel
Book of Genesis people
Tribe of Dan